IntelliJ IDEA is an integrated development environment (IDE) written in Java for developing computer software written in Java, Kotlin, Groovy, and other JVM-based languages. It is developed by JetBrains (formerly known as IntelliJ) and is available as an Apache 2 Licensed community edition, and in a proprietary commercial edition. Both can be used for commercial development.

History
The first version of IntelliJ IDEA was released in January 2001 and was one of the first available Java IDEs with advanced code navigation and code refactoring capabilities integrated.

In 2009, JetBrains released the source code for IntelliJ IDEA under the open-source Apache License 2.0. JetBrains also began distributing a limited version of IntelliJ IDEA consisting of open-source features under the moniker Community Edition. The commercial Ultimate Edition provides additional features and remains available for a fee.

In a 2010 InfoWorld report, IntelliJ received the highest test center score out of the four top Java programming tools: Eclipse, IntelliJ IDEA, NetBeans and JDeveloper.

In December 2014, Google announced version 1.0 of Android Studio, an open-source IDE for Android apps, based on the open source community edition. Other development environments based on IntelliJ's framework include AppCode, CLion, DataGrip, GoLand, PhpStorm, PyCharm, Rider, RubyMine, WebStorm, and MPS.

System requirements

Features

Coding assistance
The IDE provides certain features like code completion by analyzing the context, code navigation which allows jumping to a class or declaration in the code directly, code refactoring, code debugging
, linting and options to fix inconsistencies via suggestions.

Built in tools and integration
The IDE provides integration with build/packaging tools like Grunt, bower, Gradle, and sbt. It supports version control systems like Git, Mercurial, Perforce, and Subversion. Databases like Microsoft SQL Server, Oracle, PostgreSQL, SQLite, and MySQL can be accessed directly from the IDE in the Ultimate edition, through an embedded version of DataGrip, another IDE developed by JetBrains.

Plugin ecosystem 
IntelliJ supports plugins through which one can add additional functionality to the IDE. Plugins can be downloaded and installed either from IntelliJ's plugin repository website or through the IDE's inbuilt plugin search and install feature. Each edition has separate plugin repositories, with both the Community and Ultimate editions totaling over 3000 plugins each as of 2019.

Supported languages
The Community and Ultimate editions differ in their support for various programming languages as shown in the following table.

Supported in both Community and Ultimate Edition:
 CSS, Sass, SCSS, Less, Stylus
 Groovy
 HTML, XML, JSON, YAML
 Java
 Kotlin
 Markdown
 XSL, XPATH

Supported in both Community and Ultimate Edition via plugins:
 Clojure
 CloudSlang
 Dart
 Elm
 Erlang
 Gosu
 Haskell
 Haxe
 Julia
 Lua
 Perl
 Python
 R
 Rust
 Scala

Supported only in Ultimate Edition:
 CoffeeScript, ActionScript
 JavaScript, TypeScript
 SQL

Supported only in Ultimate Edition via plugins:
 Cython
 Go
 PHP
 Ruby and JRuby

Technologies and frameworks

Supported in both Community and Ultimate Edition:

 Android (includes the Android Studio's functionality)
 Ant
 Gradle
 Test runners (JUnit, TestNG, Spock, Cucumber, ScalaTest, spec2, etc.)
 JavaFX
 Maven

Supported only in Ultimate Edition:

 Django
 Thymeleaf, FreeMarker, Velocity
 Grails
 Java EE (JSF, JAX-RS, CDI, JPA, etc)
 Micronaut, Quarkus, Helidon
 Node.js, React, Vue.js, Angular
 AspectJ, JBoss Seam, OSGi
 Play
 Ruby on Rails
 sbt
 Spring

There was a free plugin from Atlassian for IntelliJ available to integrate with JIRA, Bamboo, Crucible and FishEye. However, the software, called IDE-Connector, was discontinued on June 1, 2015.

Software versioning and revision control
The two editions also differ in their support for software versioning and revision control systems.

Supported in both Community and Ultimate Edition:
 Git
 Mercurial
 Subversion
 Azure DevOps (formerly TFS/VSTS; via plug-in)

Supported only in Ultimate Edition:
 Perforce

See also

 Comparison of integrated development environments
 GitHub Copilot

Bibliography

References

Free integrated development environments
Integrated development environments
Java development tools
Products introduced in 2001
Software using the Apache license